Keāhole Point is the westernmost point of the island of Hawaii. The Kona International Airport was moved here from directly north of the town of Kailua-Kona in 1970, when the previous smaller airstrip was converted into the Old Kona Airport State Recreation Area. The name comes from Ke āhole since the āhole fish (Kuhlia sandvicensis) was found nearby.

Between the airport and the coast lies the Natural Energy Laboratory of Hawaii.  Most of the land was formed in 1801 by the Huehue lava flow from Hualālai.  This flow extended the shoreline out an estimated 1 mile, adding some 4 km2 of land to the island.  The southern part of this point is sometimes referred to as Kalihi Point.

The Ahupuaa (ancient name of the community in this area) was Kalaoa, still used by the census.  
The site includes a house platform, a walled enclosure, a debris pile with volcanic glass and marine shells, and a larger wall.
Probably the home of a common family, an excavation in 1975 estimated occupation from about 1500 to 1800.
On January 14, 1989, the Kalaoa Permanent House Site was put on the state register of historic places as site number 10-27-10,205. On November 21, 1992, it was added to the National Register of Historic Places as site number 92001552. It was described as site 81 in a 1930 survey by Reinecke, and site 8 in a 1975 survey by Rosendahl & Kirch, and site HA-D15-12 on a state survey. Just south of this area is the area known as Ooma.

References

Headlands of Hawaii
Landforms of Hawaii (island)
Houses on the National Register of Historic Places in Hawaii
Archaeological sites in Hawaii
Archaeological sites on the National Register of Historic Places in Hawaii
Buildings and structures in Hawaii County, Hawaii
Beaches of Hawaii (island)
National Register of Historic Places in Hawaii County, Hawaii